Fin de partie is a one-act opera by György Kurtág, set to a French-language libretto adapted by the composer from the play Endgame (French title: Fin de partie) by Samuel Beckett, with the inclusion of a setting of Beckett's English-language poem "Roundelay" at the start of the opera. Kurtág fully titled this work, his first opera, Samuel Beckett: Fin de partie: scènes et monologues, opéra en un acte. Kurtág dedicated the opera to the memory of "mon professeur Ferenc Farkas and of mon ami ": qui, dans ma jeunesse, m'ont appri (sic) l'essentiel sur l'opéra [who, in my youth, taught me the essentials of opera].

History
The Teatro alla Scala, Milan, commissioned the opera, and staged the premiere on 15 November 2018. The premiere production was a joint production between La Scala and Dutch National Opera (DNO), Amsterdam. The DNO staged the opera in March 2019. The production travelled to Paris in April–May 2022.

On the recommendation of György Ligeti, Kurtág had seen a production of Beckett's play in Paris in 1957. This experience greatly affected Kurtág, which he described to the American music critic Jeremy Eichler as "one of the strongest experiences of my life". For his opera, Kurtág condensed the play, retaining around 60% of the French text. He has acknowledged his studies of the operas of Claudio Monteverdi as inspiration for his own opera.

The original commission for the work arrived in 2010 from La Scala. Kurtág initially wished there to be no contract and no commission fee. The  provided financial support for the commission. Kurtág spent eight years on the composition of the opera, with assistance from his wife Marta. Kurtág did not attend the world premiere performance because his frail health rendered him unable to travel from Budapest to Milan.

Roles

Synopsis

The setting is a house by the sea, where four people reside:
Hamm, an elderly gentleman confined to a wheelchair
Clov, servant to Hamm, who cannot sit down
Nagg and Nell, Hamm's very old parents, each trapped in a dustbin, without legs

The tensions between the four characters exasperate each of them:
Hamm cannot abide his parents and their chatter.
Nell can barely tolerate Nagg.
Clov regards the others wearily.
All four wait for an end to the inertia and claustrophobia of their situation.

 Prologue: Nell is the first character to appear, and delivers the setting of 'Roundelay' to begin the opera. Her words hazily allude to memories, with the sound of footsteps as the only sound to be heard on the beach.
 Clov's Pantomime: Clov and Hamm appear. Clov is troubled and uneasy on his legs. He makes repetitive gestures, the same gestures every day, during his domestic chores, interspersed with short, nervous laughter.
 Clov's First Monologue: Clov speaks of the possibility that the current situation may come to some sort of end soon.
 Hamm's First Monologue: by contrast, Hamm thinks about his and his parents' sufferings. With feelings of despondency and exhaustion, he claims that he cannot resolve the current circumstances.
 Bin: Nagg and Nell, both severely handicapped, are tired out from their long-term bickering, and their mutual incomprehension. During their conversation, they recall the cycling accident in the Ardennes that caused them both to lose their legs. Memories also surface of a boat trip on Lake Como. These memories are their sole happy memories and, at least superficially, give them a little nostalgia for their life spent together. Yet, Hamm, who wants to sleep, finds his parents' chatter irritating, and orders Clov to throw the bins, including Nagg and Nell, into the sea. Nell dies in the meantime, apparently unnoticed by the others.
 Novel: Hamm wants to tell Nagg a story. In past days, a father had come to him on Christmas Eve asking for bread for his son. Hamm had decided to take him on.
 Nagg's Monologue: Nagg remembers when Hamm was young and needed him.
 Hamm's Penultimate Monologue: Hamm ponders his difficult relations with others.
 Hamm and Clov's Dialogue: Hamm asks Clov for his tranquilliser. Clov replies that no tranquillisers are left.
 "It's over, Clov" and Clov's Vaudeville: Hamm tells Clov that he no longer needs him, but then asks Clov to say something that he may remember before departing. Clov remarks that Hamm had never spoken to him until that moment. Only now, as he is about to leave, does Hamm pay any notice of him.
 Clov's Last Monologue: Clov reflects on his condition. He has never understood what words like 'love' and 'friendship' mean. He also feels old, tired, and unable to form new habits. He is bound to his repetitive, never-changing daily routine.
 Transition to the Finale: Hamm thanks Clov as Clov is about to leave.
 Hamm's Last Monologue: Clov is about to leave, but has not yet moved. Hamm realises that he has been left alone.
 Epilogue: Hamm grasps that it is now up to him – and him alone – to continue playing the endgame.

Reception
Both Andrew Clements and Fiona Maddocks of The Guardian awarded Fin de partie a full five stars. Alex Ross wrote in The New Yorker that "it seems the equal of the celebrated text on which it is based. Beckett has been waiting for Kurtág all this time." The opera later ranked fourth in a poll by The Guardian of the greatest 21st century works of classical music.

References

External links
 Teatro alla Scala page on Fin de partie
 Libretto of Fin de partie
 Teatro alla Scala, English-language synopsis of Fin de partie

Compositions by György Kurtág
2018 operas
French-language operas
Opera world premieres at La Scala
Operas based on plays
Music dedicated to family or friends
Samuel Beckett
Operas